Torbolton is a geographic township and former municipality that was originally part of Carleton County in eastern Ontario, Canada.

Torbolton is located in the north-western part of the county, bordered to the southwest by Fitzroy Township, to the southeast by March Township and to the north by the Ottawa River. It includes the communities of Baskin's Beach, Buckham's Bay, Constance Bay, Dirleton, Kilmaurs, MacLarens, and Woodlawn.

The township was established in 1821. Although white pine was harvested from the forests of this area from the beginning of the 19th century, the first permanent settler is believed to have been David MacLaren in the 1820s. In 1974, the township  was amalgamated with Huntley and Fitzroy to form West Carleton. In 2001, West Carleton became part of the new city of Ottawa.

Torbolton took its name from the village of Tarbolton in Ayrshire, Scotland. Lord Torbolton was one of the titles of Charles Lennox, 4th Duke of Richmond, who was Governor General of British North America from 1818 to 1819.

According to the Canada 2016 Census, the Township had a population of 6,974. As of the Canada 2021 Census, this had increased to 7,000.

Reeves
1850 David MacLaren
1852 James Grierson
1856 John Buckham
1865 J. Hedley
1866 John Smith
1878 James Mills
1880 James Grierson
1887 James Mills
1890 James Grierson
1891 W. Newham
1892 C. Buckham
1897 n/a
1907 W.J. Armitage
1917 Isaac Davis
1918 W.J. Armitage
1919 Isaac Davis
1921 John T. Armitage
1938 Thomas A. Dolan
1963 R.C. Thomas
1968 Thomas A. Dolan

See also
List of townships in Ontario

References

Former municipalities now in Ottawa
Geographic townships in Ontario
Populated places established in 1821
Populated places disestablished in 1974
1821 establishments in Canada